Las Palmas is a corregimiento in Las Palmas District, Veraguas Province, Panama with a population of 3,106 as of 2010. It is the seat of Las Palmas District. Its population as of 1990 was 3,852; its population as of 2000 was 3,259.

References

Corregimientos of Veraguas Province